V is a 1991 neo noir erotic thriller film directed by Simon Moore and starring Liam Neeson and Laura San Giacomo. Neeson won best actor at the 1992 Festival du Film Policier de Cognac for his performance.

Plot
The film is set in the late 1950s, when strict British divorce laws could be circumvented by manufacturing fake evidence of adultery, and in Brighton, where such activities often occurred. An amoral private detective, who with the help of his wife provides phoney photographs and paid witnesses for divorce cases, becomes a prime suspect when his wife and a wealthy artist client are murdered.

Cast
 Liam Neeson as Tony Aaron
 Laura San Giacomo as Angeline
 Kenneth Cranham as Frank
 Maggie O'Neill as Hazel Aaron
 Stephen Moore as Roscoe
 Alphonsia Emmanuel as Selina
 Alex Norton as Prosecuting Attorney 
 Kevin Moore as Barrister

Release

Reception
On review aggregator website Rotten Tomatoes gives the film a rating of 25% based on reviews from 8 critics.

References

External links
 
 

British detective films
1991 films
Films set in 1959
1991 crime thriller films
British crime thriller films
Columbia Pictures films
Films scored by Christopher Gunning
1990s English-language films
1990s British films